Belarus–Czech Republic relations are foreign relations between Belarus and the Czech Republic.  Both countries established diplomatic relations in 1993.  Belarus has an embassy in Prague.  The Czech Republic has an embassy in Minsk.

Both countries are full members of the Organization for Security and Co-operation in Europe.

In October 2020, Czech Republic and other countries recalled their ambassadors from Belarus following disputed presidential elections.

In May 2021, Czech Republic suspended flights between the two countries after Belarus' air hijacking. The country also set up an office in Prague for the Belarusian opposition. Foreign Minister  stated, "The Belarusian opposition has and will have the unequivocal support of the Czech Republic."

See also 
 Foreign relations of Belarus 
 Foreign relations of the Czech Republic
 Belarus–EU relations

References

External links 
  Belarusian embassy in Prague (in Russian only) 
  Czech embassy in Minsk (in Czech and Belarusian only)

 
Czech Republic
Bilateral relations of the Czech Republic